Bribery, Corruption Also is a crime novel by H. R. F. Keating. It is the twenty-third novel in the Inspector Ghote series.

Plot introduction

The twenty-third Inspector Ghote novel finds the detective out of his element. His wife, Protima, has inherited a crumbling mansion in her native Calcutta along with enough money for the couple to renovate the property and retire in luxury, but Ghote is unhappy. Calcutta is a long way from his native Mumbai and he finds it difficult to stop being a detective.

Protima is determined that they should live in the house and enjoy life in the beautiful city that she has not seen since she was a young woman, but the solicitor handling the will advises them to sell and claims he is unable to release any money from the estate to help with their expenses.

Ghote begins to suspect corruption when he learns of a planned housing development close to the mansion but soon his investigation places the couple in grave danger.

Explanation of the novel's title

The title comes from Inspector Ghote's musings towards the end of the novel, as he reflects that bribery and corruption will always be part of life, no matter how hard people try to suppress them.

Plot summary

Inspector Ghote's wife Protima has inherited a fortune and a mansion in Calcutta. Ghote is not pleased because it means he must leave his native Mumbai and give up being a policeman. No sooner have they landed in Calcutta than they discover the house is crumbling and inhabited by hostile squatters. Also a housing development is planned in the wetlands behind the house, which has the only access to the proposed construction project.

The solicitor in charge of the administering the will, A. K. Dutt-Daster, advises them to sell promptly and return home, but Ghote suspects corruption.

As Ghote investigates he uncovers a web of corruption that leads inexorably higher and higher in Calcutta's social and political hierarchy. On the way he encounters the easily bribed solicitor's clerk, who is soon murdered for obtaining incriminating documents from Dutt-Daster's files, he is assaulted under The Great Banyan tree in the Indian Botanical Gardens, meets a crusading newspaper editor who chooses his crusades very carefully, a cynical and corrupt Police Inspector and a powerful businessman who doesn't believe corruption is a bad thing.

Powerful forces are aligned against the elderly couple and ultimately they cannot be overcome. Finally Ghote finds himself obliged to pay a handsome bribe simply so the couple can escape from Calcutta with their freedom and lives.

Corruption and bribery will always be a part of life no matter how much people fight against it, Ghote reflects on the way home, but that is not a valid reason to give in to such things.

Characters in "Bribery, Corruption Also"

Inspector Ghote: A hard working and honest, if often beleaguered police detective from Mumbai, India.

Protima Ghote: Inspector Ghote's wife. A native of Calcutta, India who has lived in Mumbai for most of her life.

A. K. Dutt-Daster: A Calcutta solicitor whose ethics are quickly shown to be highly questionable.

Major themes

The novel focuses on the ethics of corruption and bribery. The characters are frequently placed in situations where they must perform a moral balancing act between achieving worthy goals and using dishonest and immoral methods to accomplish them.

Literary significance & criticism

"As good a story as Keating has ever written, and the conclusion is as apt as it is touching" Birmingham Post

"The Indianness of it all is conveyed with utmost skill." Evening Standard

Allusions/references to actual history, geography and current science

The novel is set in Calcutta, India and features many of the city's tourist attractions such as the Indian Botanical Gardens, including The Great Banyan tree and the Kalighat Kali Temple.

Release details
 1999, United Kingdom, MacMillan,  / 978-0-333-74568-7, Pub date 22 January 1999, Hardback
 1999, United Kingdom, Ulverscroft Large Print Books Ltd,  / 978-0-7089-4149-2, November 1999, Hardback
 1999, United States, Isis Audio Books,  / 978-0-7531-0580-1, May 1999, Audio book
 1999, United States, St Martin's Press,  / 978-0-312-20502-7, August 1999, Hardback

Reviews

Sources, references, external links, quotations
Bribery, Corruption Also at Fantastic Fiction.co.uk
reviews for Bribery, Corruption Also at Barnes & Noble.com
Amazon.co.uk with customer reviews and book details

1999 British novels
British crime novels
Novels set in Kolkata
Macmillan Publishers books